Jonathan Peter Morgan (born 10 July 1970) is a Welsh former professional footballer who played as a midfielder. During his career, he made over 50 appearances in the Football League for Cardiff City. He retired from playing at the age of 26 and later became a teacher. In 2022, he was appointed principal of Coleg y Cymoedd.

Career
Morgan was born in Cardiff and was a keen supporter of the city's football team, Cardiff City. He left school at the age of 15 and signed for the club on a two-year apprenticeship shortly after his 16th birthday, before being given his first professional contract at the age of 18 in 1988. He made his professional debut for the club on 28 September 1988, playing in a 3–0 defeat against Queens Park Rangers in the Football League Cup, before making his league debut a week later in a 2–1 defeat to Reading on 8 October.

His first goal for the club came the following season, netting in a 1–1 draw with Birmingham City on 31 October 1989. He was a regular throughout the campaign, appearing 32 times in the Football League Third Division as Cardiff suffered relegation after finishing in 21st position. However, a persistent ankle injury led to his early retirement from professional football at the age of 22. His final professional appearance came in a 2–0 victory over Gillingham on 15 February 1991. He played semi-professional football until the age of 26, including a spell with Merthyr Tydfil, before retiring at the age of 26.

Career statistics

Later life

After leaving Cardiff City in 1992, Morgan enrolled at Cardiff Metropolitan University, where he attained a degree in recreation and leisure management and a master's in sports and leisure studies. Following his graduation, he took up a number of sport teaching roles in London, before returning to Wales as the Head of Faculty of Ystrad Mynach College in 2002. He was promoted to vice principal of Coleg y Cymoedd in 2019, where he served for three years before being appointed principal in 2022.

References

1970 births
Living people
Footballers from Cardiff
Welsh footballers
Wales youth international footballers
Association football midfielders
Cardiff City F.C. players
Merthyr Town F.C. players
English Football League players
Alumni of Cardiff Metropolitan University
Welsh educators